The Finance Act 2002 (c.23) is an Act of the Parliament of the United Kingdom prescribing changes to excise duties, Value Added Tax, Income Tax, Corporation Tax and Capital Gains Tax. It enacts the 2002 Budget speech made by Chancellor of the Exchequer Gordon Brown to the Parliament of the United Kingdom.

In the UK, the Chancellor delivers an annual Budget speech outlining changes in spending, tax and duty. The respective year's Finance Act is the mechanism to enact the changes.

The rules governing the various taxation methods are contained within the various taxation acts. (For instance Capital Gains Tax Legislation is contained within Taxation of Chargeable Gains Act 1992. The Finance Act details amendments to be made to each one of these Acts.)

Provisions
The Climate Change Levy was revised.

United Kingdom Acts of Parliament 2002
2002 in economics
Tax legislation in the United Kingdom